Paul Paeschke (27 February 1875 – 10 June 1943) was a German painter. His work was part of the painting event in the art competition at the 1928 Summer Olympics.

References

Further reading
 Fritz Hellwag: Paul Paeschkes Pastell-Landschaften. In: Kunst für Alle, 57. Jahrg., Heft 4, München, January 1942, p. 73 ff.
 Paul Paeschke: Der Gröditzberg nach seiner naturwissenschaftlichen, kultur- und kunstgeschichtlichen Bedeutung. 6th edition. Verlag Oscar Heinze, Liegnitz 1928, 96 pp.
 Paul Paeschke: Burgschloß Tzschocha: Ein Beitrag zur Orts- und Heimatkunde Niederschlesiens. Iser-Verlag, Leipzig 1922, 33 pp.
 Paul Paeschke: Die spanische Reise. In: Velhagen & Klasings Monatshefte, 45. Jahrg., Bielefeld 1930/31, 2. Band, pp. 477 ff.
 "Paeschke, Paul". In: Hans Vollmer (ed.): Allgemeines Lexikon der bildenden Künstler des XX. Jahrhunderts. Band 3: K–P. E. A. Seemann, Leipzig 1956, p. 538
 Paul Weiglin: Paul Paeschke. In: Velhagen & Klasings Monatshefte, 43. Jahrg., Bielefeld 1927, 3. Band, pp. 262 ff.
 Otto Weigmann: Paul Paeschke als Graphiker. In: Kunst für Alle: Malerei, Plastik, Graphik, Architektur, 31. Jahrg., München 1915/16, pp. 20 ff. (Heidelberger historische Bestände – digital version)
 Irmgard Wirth: Paul Paeschke, einem Berliner Maler zum 100. Geburtstag. Catalogue of exhibition in the Berlin Museum, Berlin 1975

1875 births
1943 deaths
20th-century German painters
20th-century German male artists
German male painters
Olympic competitors in art competitions
People from Berlin